Herminia Rodríguez Fernández (died 15 January 1944) was a Cuban politician. She was elected to the House of Representatives in 1936 as one of the first group of women to enter Congress.

Biography
Rodríguez was a Nationalist Union candidate for the House of Representatives in Camagüey Province in the 1936 general elections, the first in which women could vote, and was one of seven women elected. She was re-elected as a Republican Democratic Party candidate in 1940, serving in the House until her death on 15 January 1944.

References

20th-century Cuban women politicians
20th-century Cuban politicians
Nationalist Union politicians
Republican Democratic Party (Cuba) politicians
Members of the Cuban House of Representatives
Date of birth unknown
1944 deaths